Hara Station is a name for several train stations in Japan

 Hara Station (Shizuoka) in Shizuoka prefecture
 Hara Station (Aichi) in Aichi prefecture
 Hara Station (Kagawa) in Kagawa prefecture